Ma On Shan Public Library is a public library located at 14 On Chun Street, Ma On Shan, Hong Kong. It opened on 2 April 2005 and was built next to Ma On Shan Park. It has a characteristic main building in a cylindrical shape. The library has more than 150,000 books.

Ma On Shan
Public libraries in Hong Kong
Library buildings completed in 2005
Libraries in Hong Kong
Libraries established in 2005